William Patrick "Pat" Sullivan (August 30, 1909 – 1981) was an Indian field hockey player who competed in the 1932 Summer Olympics.

In 1932 he was a member of the Indian field hockey team, which won the gold medal. He played one match as forward.

He was born in Lonavla, India.

External links
 
 William Sullivan's profile at databaseOlympics.com
 William Sullivan's profile at Sports Reference.com

1909 births
1981 deaths
Field hockey players from Maharashtra
Olympic field hockey players of India
Field hockey players at the 1932 Summer Olympics
Indian male field hockey players
Olympic gold medalists for India
Anglo-Indian people
Olympic medalists in field hockey
Medalists at the 1932 Summer Olympics
Indian emigrants to England
British people of Anglo-Indian descent